We're a Happy Family: A Tribute to Ramones is a 2003 tribute album to the Ramones by various artists. It started when Johnny Ramone was presented with the idea of a tribute album and was asked if he wanted to participate, to which he agreed, as long as he would have full control over the project. He was able to get Rob Zombie as a co-producer, and call upon high profile bands to participate. Rob Zombie also did the cover artwork, and Stephen King, a Ramones fan, wrote the liner notes.

One of the last things Johnny Ramone did was oversee the album. He advised all the chosen bands to make the songs their own. Ramone liked the Red Hot Chili Peppers' cover of "Havana Affair" so much that he chose to open the album with it.

The Ataris' cover of "Rock N' Roll High School" is as a bonus CD single sold along with the physical album.

Reception
We're a Happy Family, wrote Jaan Uhelszki in Mojo, "doesn't send you running to dig out Rocket to Russia in disgust. Instead, it's edifying to see their trademark minimalist sound transmuted in the hands of their most high profile fans.… Kiss get the best-in-show nod for their anthemic 'Do You Remember Rock 'n' Roll Radio?', which sounds ripped right off an early Slade album."

Track listing
"Havana Affair" (Ramones, 1976) – Red Hot Chili Peppers
 The song was later released as a bonus track on the iTunes version of Stadium Arcadium, but as of 2010 has been removed from iTunes entirely. It was, however, later re-released digitally on the iTunes Rock & Roll Hall of Fame Covers EP.
"Blitzkrieg Bop" (Ramones, 1976) – Rob Zombie
 The song later appeared on Rob Zombie's greatest hits album Past, Present & Future.
"I Believe in Miracles" (Brain Drain, 1989) – Eddie Vedder & Zeke
"53rd & 3rd" (Ramones, 1976) – Metallica
 Five more Ramones covers from the same sessions were released on different editions of the "St. Anger" single.
"Beat on the Brat" (Ramones, 1976) – U2
"Do You Remember Rock 'n' Roll Radio?" (End of the Century, 1980) – KISS
 The song later appeared on the single-disc edition of Alive IV.
"The KKK Took My Baby Away" (Pleasant Dreams, 1981) – Marilyn Manson
"I Just Want to Have Something to Do" (Road to Ruin, 1978) – Garbage
 The song was later released as a B-side to their single "Why Do You Love Me", and as a regional bonus track on their Bleed Like Me album.
"Outsider" (Subterranean Jungle, 1983) – Green Day
 The song originally appeared as a B–side to the "Warning" single, and later on the compilation album Shenanigans.
"Something to Believe In" (Animal Boy, 1986) – The Pretenders
"Sheena Is a Punk Rocker" (Rocket to Russia, 1977) – Rancid
"I Wanna Be Your Boyfriend" (Ramones, 1976) – Pete Yorn
"I Wanna Be Sedated" (Road to Ruin, 1978) – The Offspring
 This song originally appeared on the soundtrack for Idle Hands.
"Here Today, Gone Tomorrow" (Rocket to Russia, 1977) – Rooney
 Johnny Ramone wanted Lisa Marie Presley to record the song for the tribute album. She later recorded it for her album Now What.
"Return of Jackie & Judy" (End of the Century, 1980) – Tom Waits
 The song later appeared on Waits' box set album Orphans: Brawlers, Bawlers & Bastards.
"Daytime Dilemma (Dangers of Love)" (Too Tough to Die, 1984) – Eddie Vedder & Zeke
 This track is not listed on the track list of all editions.
Silence – 0:10
Silence – 0:10
Silence – 0:10
"Today Your Love, Tomorrow the World" (Ramones, 1976) – John Frusciante (hidden track)
 This bonus track is not available on all editions.
 Tracks 17–19 each contain 10 seconds of silence

Charts

References

External links
Album's official site (Archive, 23 Feb 2009)

Albums produced by Rob Zombie
2003 compilation albums
Ramones tribute albums
Columbia Records compilation albums